Amirabad (also Romanized as Amīrābād; also known as Amīrābād-e Pā Gach) is a village in Tombi Golgir Rural District, Golgir District, Masjed Soleyman County, Khuzestan Province, Iran. At the 2006 census, its population was 62, in 15 families.

References 

Populated places in Masjed Soleyman County